Robert Mowbray may refer to:

Robert de Mowbray (died 1125)
Sir Robert Mowbray, 2nd Baronet (1850–1916), British Conservative politician

See also
 Robert Mowbray Howard (1854–1928), British official and editor